Tendürek is a shield volcano located in the Ağrı and Van provinces of eastern Turkey, close to the borders with Iran. Two main cones with a crater each and several minor lateral cones form the edifice. The edifice dates 700,000–500,000 years BP to 13,000 BP and is mostly constructed from basaltic lavas, with some pyroclastics and trachytic/trachyandesitic lavas. It has a volume of more than 300 km3 and covers a surface area of about 650 km2. Pyroclastic cones with basaltic lava flows on the eastern side of the mountain are around 2,500 years old. The last known eruption may have been a gas and ash eruption in 1855, and hydrothermal systems exist on the volcano. Since 1993, the volcano has been subsiding in a ring fault. The Armenian name for the mountain was Tondrak. The medieval Armenian Tondrakians, a religious movement of the 950s, is named after this area.

Significance 

The volcano is known for having the Durupınar site. Due to its size and ship-like shape, this big aggregate structure is considered by some to be Noah's Ark, but this is disputed.

See also 

 Armenian highlands
 List of volcanoes in Turkey
 Flood geology
 Flood myth
 Mountains of Ararat
 Mount Ararat
 Ararat anomaly
 Zagros Mountains
 Mount Judi

References 

 
 An active ring fault detected at Tendürek volcano by using InSAR, Journal of Geophysical Research.
 Geology of the quaternary volcanic centres of the east Anatolia, Journal of Volcanology and Geothermal Research.
 Annäherung an Armenien: Geschichte und Gegenwart, Tessa Hofmann, Tessa Savvidis. 

Mountains of Turkey
Volcanoes of Turkey
Polygenetic shield volcanoes
Landforms of Ağrı Province
Landforms of Van Province
Mountains of the Armenian Highlands
Three-thousanders of Turkey